Gnosis is the common Greek noun for knowledge.

Gnosis may also refer to:

 GNOSIS, a capability-based operating system
 Gnosis (artist), the artist's name signed upon the famous 'deer hunt mosaic'
 Gnosis (chaos magic), an altered state of consciousness in chaos magic
 Gnosis (Gnidrolog album), the fourth album of the British progressive rock band, Gnidrolog
 Gnosis (magazine), an American magazine published from 1985 to 1999
 Gnosis (Monuments album), the debut studio album by British progressive metal band Monuments
 Gnosis (Russian Circles album), the eighth album by post-metal band Russian Circles
 Gnosis, a 2008 science fiction thriller novel by Adam Fawer
 Gnosis, antagonists in the role-playing video game series Xenosaga
 Gnosis, an item to represent an Archon's status in the video game Genshin Impact
 Unverified personal gnosis, spiritual belief not corroborated by historical texts or tradition